Matthew Dennis Lewis  is an American actor notable for appearing in the Netflix Western series Godless (2017) and chess prodigy series The Queen’s Gambit (2020).

He appears with his twin brother Russell Dennis Lewis in several shows.

Early life
Matthew Dennis Lewis was born and raised in the town of Binghamton in the Southern Tier of New York and has three brothers, one of whom is fellow actor twin Russell.  He  worked at a tanning salon, as a fitness and swimwear model,  before deciding to pursue acting. His brother Russ was already a student at an acting conservatory in New York City. Lewis moved to New York City and trained and competed in the martial art of Muay Thai. He has said having a martial arts background helped him secure parts. Lewis lived in New York City for six years before moving to Los Angeles where he currently (April 2020) resides and works. He has stated that he would have considered studying marine biology or kinesiology if he had not become an actor.

Career
Lewis and his brother have played twins Seth and Steve Rhodes in the CBS series Blue Bloods (2019), and again as Charlie and Big Joe in the supernatural thriller Burning Shadow (2018), In 2017, Lewis and Russell had recurring roles as twin brothers Donnie and Daryl Devlin, in the Netflix Western series Godless (2017).

In 2020, they once again had recurring roles as Matt and Mike in the chess prodigy series  The Queen’s Gambit (2020).

In 2022, Lewis and his brother Russell modelled for HUF magazine for a project named 'The King's Gambit'. They appeared together as the McPhail twins in an episode of Interview with the Vampire, Agin in 2022, they played twins Colby and Carrington Reed, in an episode of So Help Me Todd,

Filmography

Film

Television

References

External links 

Burning Shadow Trailer

Living people
21st-century American actors
People from New York (state)
American male film actors
American male television actors
Year of birth missing (living people)
American identical twin actors